Kafr al-Labad is a Palestinian village in the Tulkarm Governorate in the northeastern West Bank, located 9 kilometers east of Tulkarm and two kilometers south of Anabta. Its population in 2007 was 4,074 according to the Palestinian Central Bureau of Statistics. It has a total land area of 11,917 dunams, of which 25% is used for agricultural purposes. The town's main agricultural products are olives, fruits and wheat.

History
Byzantine ceramics have been found here.

Ottoman era
Kafr al-Labad, like all of Palestine, was incorporated into the Ottoman Empire in 1517.  In the 1596  tax registers,  Kafr al-Labad was part of the nahiya ("subdistrict") of Jabal Sami, part of the larger Sanjak of Nablus. It had a population of 57 households and 6 bachelors, all Muslims. The inhabitants paid a fixed tax rate of 33,3% on agricultural products, including wheat, barley, summer crops, olive trees,  goats and beehives, in addition to occasional revenues; a total of 6,500  akçe.

In 1863 Victor Guérin visited, and found: 'the ruins of an ancient town, which is nowhere mentioned, at least under this name, in the sacred books. Important remains still exist, such as the lower courses of several buildings of cut stone, lying, with much regularity and without cement, upon each other. One of these, of rectangular form, and built east and west, measures  22 paces in length and 15 in breadth. The door was ornamented with monolith pilasters, still standing.

Another similar building belonging to this is somewhat smaller, but at a little distance is found a third more considerable, and built north and south, 50 paces long by 25 broad. There are two entrances, one on the north, with a circular arch, and the other on the south, rectangular. Within the enclosure, entirely constructed of cut stone of good dressing, and not cemented, runs a long court, with several parallel halls, whose partition walls show the same character as the wall of the external enclosure. Other buildings, also in cut stone, and partly overthrown, strew the soil with materials scattered or lying in heaps. 
Here and there are cisterns cut in the rock.’

In 1882, the PEF's Survey of Western Palestine described Kefr el Lebad as “A small stone village on high ground, with a few olives. The valley to the north, near 'Anebta, flows with water in spring.”

British Mandate era
In the 1922 census of Palestine conducted  by the British Mandate authorities, Kufr Labad had a population of 540, all  Muslims, increasing in the 1931 census to 663  persons, all Muslim except 1 Christian, living in 167 houses.

In the early 1930s, Grace Mary Crowfoot noted how the women of Kafr al-Labad and Al Jib made pottery (without a wheel), looking much like ware made in the 8th and 7th BCE.

In the 1945 statistics the population of Kafr el Labad was 940, all Muslims,  who owned 14,757  dunams of land  according to an official land and population survey. 5,587 dunams were plantations and irrigable land, 2,257 used for cereals, while 18 dunams were built-up (urban) land.

Jordanian era
In the wake of the 1948 Arab–Israeli War, and after the 1949 Armistice Agreements, Kafr al-Labad came  under Jordanian rule.

In 1961, the population of Kafr Labad was  1,126.

Post-1967
Since the Six-Day War in 1967, Kafr al-Labad has been under Israeli occupation.
In 1995, the Israeli military confiscated about 200 dunams of Kafr al-Labad's lands to enlarge the nearby Israeli settlement of Avnei Hefetz. In total, about 355 dunams of Kafr al-Labad's lands have been added to Avnei Hefetz, while an additional 20 have been confiscated for the settlement of Einav.

References

Bibliography

External links
Welcome To Kafr al-Labad
Kofr al-Labad, Welcome to Palestine
Survey of Western Palestine, Map 11:    IAA, Wikimedia commons

Towns in the West Bank
Municipalities of the State of Palestine